John Clayton Norris (May 18, 1909 – May 18, 2008) was an American football end who played one season in the National Football League (NFL) for the Staten Island Stapletons. He played college football at Western Maryland and Maryland.

Early life and education
A native of Lancaster, Pennsylvania, Norris attended high school at Westinghouse in Pittsburgh. He then attended college at the Western Maryland and Maryland universities. At Maryland, he excelled in four sports, earning letters in football, lacrosse, track and field, and basketball. He won honorable mention honors in the all-Southern football team, was named all-Maryland in basketball, and all-American in lacrosse.

Professional career
Following his career at Maryland he signed a contract to play professional football with the National Football League (NFL)'s Staten Island Stapletons. With them he appeared in between one and two games, starting one. The Stapletons finished the year with a record of 2–7–3, and folded the next season, ending his professional career.

Death
Norris died on his 99th birthday, May 18, 2008, in California. He was the last living Staten Island Stapletons player.

References

1909 births
2008 deaths
Players of American football from Pennsylvania
Sportspeople from Lancaster, Pennsylvania
McDaniel Green Terror football players
Maryland Terrapins football players
American football tackles
American football ends
Maryland Terrapins men's lacrosse players
Maryland Terrapins men's basketball players
Maryland Terrapins men's track and field athletes
Staten Island Stapletons players